Operation Wilno may refer to:

Operation Ostra Brama (or Wilno uprising) of 1944
Vilna offensive of 1919